Lockport may refer to:

Places 
In Canada
 Lockport, Manitoba, an unincorporated community
 Lockport, Newfoundland and Labrador, an abandoned fishing village

In the United States
 Lockport, Illinois, a city
 Lockport Historic District
 Lockport, Indiana, an unincorporated town
 Lockport, Kentucky in Henry County
 Lockport, Louisiana, a town
 Lockport (city), New York
 Lockport Industrial District
 Lockport (town), New York, surrounding the city
 Lockport Mall, a former shopping mall
 Lockport, Ohio, a ghost town
 Platea, Pennsylvania, in Erie County, known as the Borough of Lockport until 1902
 Lockport, an old name for the village Black River, New York
 Lockport Township (disambiguation)

Other uses 
 Lockport Cave, New York, a man-made cave
 Lockport formation, a component of the Niagara Escarpment
 Lockport Subdivision, railroad line owned by CSX Transportation in the U.S. state of New York

See also 
 Lockport Station (disambiguation)
 South Lockport, New York
 Lockeport, Nova Scotia